The Swadlincote Greyhound Stadium was a greyhound racing track in Swadlincote, Derbyshire.

Opening
The stadium opened in 1932 and was located on the north side of Darklands Lane which led to many calling it the Darklands Sports Stadium.

Greyhound racing
The racing was independent (not affiliated to the sports governing body the National Greyhound Racing Club) and was known as a flapping track, which was the nickname given to independent tracks. The racing is believed to have started in October 1948.

Other uses
Harness and pony racing, whippet racing and stock car racing were all held at the stadium.

Closure
The stadium is believed to have closed in 1962.

References

Defunct greyhound racing venues in the United Kingdom
Defunct sports venues in Derbyshire